Henry Osborne (August 21, 1751 – November 9, 1800) was a public official from Pennsylvania and Georgia.

Biography
Born in Ireland, he emigrated to Pennsylvania in 1779, where he became a lawyer. He served as a judge advocate of the Pennsylvania militia during the American Revolution, but was removed from office in 1783 by the Supreme Executive Council for bigamy.

After his removal from office, he moved to Georgia, buying land in Camden County. In 1786, he was elected to the Georgia Assembly and served until 1788. He was elected as a delegate to the Continental Congress in 1786 but did not attend. In 1787, he signed the charter of St. Marys and agreed to buy stock in the town.

Henry Osborne served as a Commissioner of the United States for Indian Affairs in the Southern Department in the late 1780s. He negotiated talks between United States officials and the Creek Nation. He became a Georgia Chief Justice in March 1787, and office he held until January 1789 when he became a judge of the Superior Court in the western district. Oborne was impeached and convicted in his impeachment trial before the Georgia Senate in December 1791 of election fraud in the election of Anthony Wayne to the U.S. House of Representatives, and removed from his judgeship. His citizenship was restored under the Georgia constitution of 1798.

Osborne died on St. Simons Island November 9, 1800.

References

People of Pennsylvania in the American Revolution
Georgia (U.S. state) state court judges
Members of the Georgia General Assembly
1751 births
1800 deaths
People from Camden County, Georgia
Impeached United States judges removed from office by state or territorial governments
18th-century American politicians